Kerochariesthes fulvoplagiata is a species of beetle in the family Cerambycidae. It was described by Stephan von Breuning in 1938. It is known from Uganda and Somalia.

References

Tragocephalini
Beetles described in 1938